James M. Edie (November 3, 1927 – February 21, 1998) was an American philosopher.

Life and career
Edie was born in Grand Forks, North Dakota.  He studied at Saint John’s University in Minnesota and at the Pontifical Atheneum of St. Anselm  in Rome before obtaining his doctorate in philosophy from the Catholic University of Leuven in Belgium.

Over his career, Edie became an important figure in the publicizing and development of phenomenology in North America.  He first taught philosophy for two years at Hobart and William Smith Colleges in Geneva, New York.  In 1961 Edie relocated to Northwestern University in Evanston, Illinois, where he remained until his retirement, serving as Chair of the Philosophy Department from 1970 to 1977.  In 1962, along with  John Daniel Wild, William A. Earle, and others, he founded the Society for Phenomenology and Existential Philosophy (SPEP). and was a member of the Executive Committee of The International Association for Philosophy and Literature for five years.

Edie was fluent in at least six languages.  He authored, co-authored, and edited a large corpus of academic papers and books during his career and, through his translations, introduced English readers to important works of contemporary continental philosophy.

James Edie died of cancer at his home in Sarasota, Florida.

Quotations from Edie's works

On his philosophical interests
"I studied, under my professors, a good deal of Husserl and his contemporaries but especially the Logical Investigations.  It became clear to me, then, that the principal foci of my philosophical interests were in questions of epistemology and the philosophy of logic, broadly conceived. I had no more interest in the mathematization of formal logic, the creation of an "artificial language", than Husserl himself, but the study of the necessary formal constraints on thinking (and all the usages of language) together with the questions these imply whether in synchronic fact or diachronic history has monopolized my attention, almost to the exclusion of other questions.

"It is said that one's self-presentation is rendered more palatable if one mentions some weaknesses.  Well, though I am not as apolitical as Husserl, nor, I hope, as lacking in common sense, questions of social and political philosophy, of value theory in general, and principally theoretical ethics leave me cold.  I once told a colleague, who was pressing me: if I ever write on ethical theory, it will be posthumously."
— "Self-presentation: James M. Edie",  Analecta Husserliana: Vol. XXVI, pp. 208-9.

Major works

Books (authored and edited)

  186 pages.

  
  .

  286 pages.

  309 pages.

  383 pages.

  414 pages.

  271 pages. .

  150 pages.  (cloth),  (paper).

  104 pages.  (trade paper),  (paper).

  111 pages.  (cloth),  (paper).

Translations
  191 pages.

  67 pages.

  228 pages.

See also
American philosophy
List of American philosophers

Notes

References
  445 pages. .

  261 pages.  (cloth),  (paper).

1927 births
1998 deaths
20th-century American essayists
20th-century American historians
20th-century American male writers
20th-century American philosophers
20th-century educational theorists
20th-century educators
20th-century social scientists
20th-century translators
Acting theorists
American educational theorists
American historians of philosophy
American logicians
American male essayists
American male non-fiction writers
American philosophy academics
American social sciences writers
American sociologists
American translators
Catholic University of Leuven alumni
Continental philosophers
Epistemologists
Existentialist and phenomenological psychologists
Existentialists
Husserl scholars
Literacy and society theorists
Metaphysics writers
Northwestern University faculty
Ontologists
People from Grand Forks, North Dakota
Phenomenologists
Philosophers from North Dakota
Philosophers of art
Philosophers of education
Philosophers of history
Philosophers of language
Philosophers of linguistics
Philosophers of logic
Philosophers of mind
Philosophers of psychology
Philosophers of religion
Philosophers of social science
Political philosophers
Social philosophers
Sociologists of art
Sociologists of education
Sociologists of religion
Sociologists of science
Theatrologists
Writers about religion and science